Nishiguchi (written: 西口) is a Japanese surname. Notable people with the surname include:

, Japanese serial killer and fraudster
, Japanese footballer
, Japanese baseball player
, Japanese footballer
, Japanese businessman

Japanese-language surnames